Thomas Trevor, 1st Baron Trevor,  (8 March 165819 June 1730) was a British judge and politician who was Attorney-General and later Lord Privy Seal.

Biography
Trevor was the second son of John Trevor (1626–1672). and was educated privately before entering the Inner Temple (1672) and Christ Church, Oxford. He was called to the bar in 1680.

He was made King's Counsel in 1683 and was knighted and made Solicitor General in 1692, being promoted to Attorney-General in 1695. In 1701 Trevor was appointed Chief Justice of the Common Pleas. He was also a Privy Councillor (1702–1714) and First Commissioner of the Great Seal (1710). In 1712 he was created a peer as Baron Trevor of Bromham. He was created as one of Harley's Dozen when twelve new peerages were distributed to shift the political balance in the Whig-dominated House of Lords towards the Tories in order to secure the Peace of Utrecht.

On the accession of George I in 1714 he was deprived of his offices for alleged Jacobite sympathies, but from 1726 he was restored to favour as Lord Privy Seal (1726 to his death), one of the Lords Justice Regents of the Realm (1727), Lord President of the Council (1730) and Governor of the Charterhouse.

In 1707 he was elected a fellow of the Royal Society.

Family
In 1690 he married Elizabeth Searle (died 1702), daughter of John Searle of Finchley; their two sons, Thomas and John, succeeded their father in turn but died without male issue, the peerage devolving upon Trevor's son from his second marriage, Robert Hampden-Trevor, 1st Viscount Hampden.

In 1704 he married Anne Bernard, (c. 1670–1723), the daughter of Robert Weldon (or Weildon), mercer in Fleet Street, London. Anne had previously been married to Sir Robert Bernard of Brampton, with whom she had had six children. Three of Trevor's sons succeeded in turn to his barony, and a fourth son, Richard Trevor (1707–1771), was bishop of St Davids from 1744 to 1752, and then bishop of Durham.

Notes

References

Further reading

1658 births
1730 deaths
English MPs 1690–1695
English MPs 1695–1698
English MPs 1701
Chief Justices of the Common Pleas
Lord Presidents of the Council
Lords Privy Seal
Members of the Privy Council of Great Britain
1
Peers of Great Britain created by Queen Anne
Attorneys General for England and Wales
Fellows of the Royal Society
Members of the Parliament of England for Plympton Erle